Palaquium calophyllum is a tree in the family Sapotaceae. The specific epithet calophyllum means "beautiful leaves".

Description
The bark is brownish grey. Inflorescences bear up to 12 flowers.

Distribution and habitat
Palaquium calophyllum is native to Sumatra, Borneo, the Philippines, Maluku and New Guinea. Its habitat is in forests from sea-level to  altitude.

References

calophyllum
Trees of Malesia
Trees of New Guinea
Plants described in 1864